Terry Flew  is an Australian media and communications scholar, and Professor of Digital Communication and Culture  in the Department of Media and Communication at the University of Sydney, Australia. He was formerly the Professor and Assistant Dean (Research) in the Creative Industries Faculty at the Queensland University of Technology. He has produced award-winning research in creative industries, media and communications, and online journalism. He is primarily known for his publication, New Media: An Introduction, which is currently in its fourth edition (2002, 2005, 2008, 2014). His research interests include digital media, global media, media policy, creative industries, media economics, and the future of journalism.

Biography
Flew graduated from the University of Sydney with a Bachelor of Economics (Honours) in 1986 and a Master of Economics in 1991. Flew received his PhD in Media and Cultural Studies from Griffith University for his thesis titled "Culture, Citizenship and Content: Australian Broadcast Media Policy and the Regulation of Commercial Television, 1972-2000".

In 1990, Flew started his teaching career as a lecturer in the Faculty of Humanities and Social Sciences at the University of Technology, Sydney. In 1994, he moved to Queensland University of Technology, Brisbane, and worked as a lecturer in Media Studies. During his role as a lecturer in the School of Media and Journalism, Flew also served as the Director of the Centre for Media Policy and Practice. Flew was appointed Senior Lecturer in 2001, and later promoted as Associate Professor and Head of Postgraduate Study in 2006. Since 2009, Flew is the Professor of Media and Communications in the Creative Industries Faculty at Queensland University of Technology, Brisbane.

Professional and research experience
Flew is the founding editor of Communication Research and Practice, a journal sponsored by the Australian and New Zealand Communication Association (ANZCA), published by Taylor & Francis. In 2009, Flew commenced his role as the President of ANZCA, while partnering with Sensis in developing Digital Media Foresight analysis to study online user behavior in news consumption . Beginning 2011, Flew also served as the Advisor to Council for the Humanities, Arts and Social Sciences (CHASS) on communication science in several Australian universities. In the same year, he was appointed as the Commissioner of the Australian Law Reform Commission, responsible of the National Classification Scheme Review, which focuses on technological and media policy in Australia. In 2012, Australian Research Council appointed Flew to be a member of Research Evaluation Committee. Flew is currently serving as the Chair of Global Communication and Social Change Division, in ICA Board.

Awards and grants
Flew has received numerous awards and grants for his research in media studies, and been involved in various projects with a cumulative total of $4.2 million. One of his notable project, titled Social Media in Times of Crisis: Learning from Recent Natural Disasters to Improve Future Strategies is made possible by the grants from Australian Research Council. The project is evaluating the usage of social media in crisis situations such as natural disaster, and exploring how such usage is utilized by government officials and citizen during emergencies. His latest grant, also from Australian Research Council, is titled Politics, Media and Democracy in Australia: Public and Producer Perceptions of the Political Public Sphere. The project focuses on political media and audience perception in Australia.

In 2019 Flew was elected fellow of the Australian Academy of the Humanities.

Works
Flew has authored eight books, including Media Economics (Palgrave, 2015), Global Creative Industries (Polity, 2013), Key Concepts in Creative Industries (Sage, 2013), Creative Industries, Culture and Policy (Sage, 2012), Understanding Global Media (Palgrave, 2007), and New Media: An Introduction (Oxford University Press, 2002, 2005, 2008, 2014). He also edited two books, titled Global Media and National Policies: The Return of the State (Palgrave, 2016, with Petros Iosifidis and Jeanette Steemers) and Creative Industries and Urban Development: Creative Cities in the 21st Century (Routledge, 2012), as well as authoring 50 book chapters. Flew has also written 81 academic journal articles and 14 research reports. He also has been the editor for 13 special issues academic journals.

New Media: An Introduction 
In New Media: An Introduction, Flew explored the theories of new media, its development and the role of new media in networked society. The book examines how new media is socially, economically and politically impacting creative industries. In the first chapter, Flew tries to define “new media” as a media that combines three Cs: computing information technology, communication network, and content. One of Flew's biggest contribution in this book is in the second chapter, in which Flew explains 20 key concepts of new media, which includes collective intelligence, convergence, creative industries, cyberspace, digital capitalism, digital copyrights/creative commons, digital divide, globalization, hype, information overload, interactivity, knowledge economy, networks, participation, remediation, security and surveillance, speed, ubiquity, user-generated content/user-led innovation, and virtuality. Flew argues that new media is unable to be categorized as dualistic, as it is an inherent part of constructing the good and the bad for the society. Flew also argues that the significance and usage of new media has not only influenced what people think but also influenced the process of such thinking. In this book, Flew also explores some of the key elements of new media and its usages in globalization, such as the culture of participatory media, the technology of games, online news and the future of digital journalism. Furthermore, Flew also explored how new media is impacting creative industries and internet governance. First published in 2002, the book is currently in its fourth edition, last published in 2014. The latest edition includes additional chapters on Transforming Higher Education, and Online Activism and Networked Politics. It also includes a substantial revision on the chapter of Online News and the Future of Journalism. The Canadian Edition of the book is published in 2011, co-written by Flew and Richard Smith, and now is in its second edition, last published in 2014.

Games: Technology, Industry, Culture 
In his book, Flew proposes that the new digital gaming trend works against the mainstream media's portrayal of players as isolated, socially-awkward adolescent boys, hidden away in darkened bedrooms. He draws on recent statistics showing that between 40-50% of those gamers are women, and that the average age of players is mid- to late-20s, rather than young teens. Flew also credits the advent of video games with popularizing innovative media technologies, allowing consumers to archive, annotate, appropriate and recirculate media content. Consumers can use this media source as an alternative tool to gain access to information within their areas of interest, and to generate their own content and ideas.

Flew says that people are drifting away from the traditional mode of consumerism. He uses the term "pro-sumer" to describe the group of users who both consume and produce new media. These "pro-sumers" involve themselves in gaming communities in which online and offline spaces become merged and indistinguishable. Flew suggests that part of the appeal of MMORPGs lies in the idea of escapism, and the ability to assume the role of someone or something that is not possible in that individual's real life. To the player, his or her online identity may be more acceptable and desirable than their real-world identity. Flew refers to this form of hopping from one persona to another as "identity tourism". Players see their in-game personae as "theirs", whereas game publishers claim ownership of all in-game characters and property, leading to tensions between the two groups. In response to the perennial question of whether violent themes and action in video games correlate with real-life acts of violence, Flew argues that the research in this area is based mostly on a flawed cause-effect model of behaviour, and is often initiated in response to a moral panic.

See also 
Video game culture

References

Year of birth missing (living people)
Living people
Academic staff of the University of Sydney
Video game culture
Fellows of the Australian Academy of the Humanities
Academic staff of Queensland University of Technology